Dietzia natronolimnaea is an alkaliphilic, aerobic, organotrophic bacteria, with type strain 15LN1 (= CBS 107.95).

References

Further reading
Sneath, Peter HA, et al. Bergey's manual of systematic bacteriology. Volume 5. Williams & Wilkins, 2012.
Koerner, Roland J., Michael Goodfellow, and Amanda L. Jones. "The genus Dietzia: a new home for some known and emerging opportunist pathogens."FEMS Immunology & Medical Microbiology 55.3 (2009): 296–305.

External links

LPSN
Type strain of Dietzia natronolimnaea at BacDive -  the Bacterial Diversity Metadatabase

Mycobacteriales
Bacteria described in 1999